B117 most often refers to B.1.1.7, a variant of COVID-19 virus SARS-CoV-2.

B117 may also refer to:

 B. 117, a musical composition by Dvořák
 ASTM B117, a corrosion standard
 Blériot 117 (B-117), a 1920s airplane

See also

 Lockheed F-117 Nighthawk, a fighter-bomber
 BOLT-117, a laser-guided bomb
 117 (disambiguation)
 B17 (disambiguation)